David Sisto Nahom is a United States Air Force lieutenant general who serves as the commander of the Alaskan Command, Eleventh Air Force, and Alaskan North American Aerospace Defense Region. He previously served as the deputy chief of staff for plans and programs from 2019 to 2022.

Nahom was born in Brookfield, Connecticut and attended the University of Colorado.

Effective dates of promotions

References

|-
 

|-
 

|-
 

|-
 

|-
 

|-
 

1966 births
Living people
Recipients of the Defense Superior Service Medal
Recipients of the Distinguished Flying Cross (United States)
Recipients of the Legion of Merit
United States Air Force personnel of the Gulf War
United States Air Force personnel of the Iraq War
United States Army Command and General Staff College alumni
University of Colorado Boulder alumni